Ágnes Szávay was the defending champion but decided not to participate.

First-seeded Roberta Vinci won the tournament, defeating 7th seed Irina-Camelia Begu in the final, 6–4, 1–6, 6–4.

Seeds

Qualifying draw

Draw

Finals

Top half

Bottom half

External links
 Main draw

GDF SUEZ Grand Prix - Singles
Budapest Grand Prix